T in the Park 2014 was a three-day music festival which took place between 10–13 July 2014 in Balado, Kinross, the 21st festival since it was founded in 1994. It was the last T in the Park festival to be held in Balado as it will be moved to Strathallan Castle for T in the Park 2015. Arctic Monkeys were the first to be announced on 19 November 2013 as a headliner act. For the first time the Saturday night entertainment was extended by an hour to finish at 1 am.

Tickets

A limited number of 'Early Bird' tickets for T in the Park went on sale at 9AM Friday 19 July at 2013 prices, with a £50 deposit required to secure a ticket. The tickets were priced as follows:

Full weekend camping ticket (Friday-Sunday arena access) - Cost: £194
Full weekend access ticket with Thursday camping (Thursday - Sunday) - Cost: £205
Weekend access ticket (Friday-Sunday) with no camping - Cost: £184

The £50 deposit scheme gave the customer the option to break up the ticket payment into three instalments. The payment break up depended on which ticket type is chosen. The breakups for the tickets were as follows:

Weekend Camping Ticket 
Initial payment - £50 (plus booking fee)
Payment due before 1 November - £72
Payment due before 1 February - £72 (plus transaction fee)

Thursday Weekend Camping Ticket
Initial payment - £50 (plus booking fee)
Payment due before 1 November - £77.50
Payment due before 1 February - £77.50 (plus transaction fee)

Non-camping Weekend Ticket
Initial payment - £50 (plus booking fee)
Payment due before 1 November - £62
Payment due before 1 February - £62 (plus transaction fee)

If the second or third instalments were not paid the £50 deposit was lost along with the booking fee and the reservation of the ticket.
In addition to the aforementioned offers, there were also combined ticket and bus options available.

Line-up
The headliner acts for 2014 were announced as Biffy Clyro, Calvin Harris and Arctic Monkeys.

Incidents
The number of arrests in 2014 fell to 52, which was significantly less than 2013 where there was 91 arrests.

} This could be attributed to the fact Showsec International Ltd replaced G4S Secure Solutions as the security provider for the event in 2014.

Chief superintendent Jim Leslie said: Generally the behavior of fans this year has been excellent.  Praise must go to them for playing their part in keeping crime figures down; for the majority, people were in tremendous spirits and focused on being here for the right reasons, to enjoy music and have a great time with friends.

The number of visits to the medical tent also dramatically dropped in 2014, with the medical team reporting 980 visits to the hospital tent.  This is a sharp decrease when compared with the 1160 visits in 2013.  The visits to the medical tent were all minor, such as: weather related ailments and sprains and strains.

Reception

Most festival-goers were happy with conditions at the festival, and remarked positively on the strength and variety of the headliners.

New location

In 2015, the festival was relocated to Strathallan Castle.
	
This was due to  a section of the festival grounds being situated over the Fortes Pipeline, causing the Health and Safety Executive(HSE) to request for the festival to be relocated away from its current site at Balado. According to HSE, an accident could result in a large number of casualties and people receiving a dangerous dose of thermal radiation.

See also

List of music festivals in the United Kingdom

References

2014 in Scotland
2014 in British music
T in the Park
July 2014 events in the United Kingdom
2014 music festivals